An albatross is one of a family of large winged seabirds.

Albatross or Albatros may also refer to:

Animals 
 Albatross (butterfly) or Appias, a genus of butterfly
 Albatross (horse) (1968–1998), a Standardbred horse

Literature
 Albatross Books, a German publishing house that produced the first modern mass market paperback books
 Albatros Literaturpreis, a literary award
 "L'albatros" (poem) ("The Albatross"), 1859 poem by Charles Baudelaire
 The Albatross, a 1971 novella by Susan Hill
 The Albatross, the fictional propeller-sustained airship in Jules Verne's novel Robur the Conqueror
 Albatross (novel), a 2019 novel by Terry Fallis

Film and television 
 Films Albatros, a French film production company which operated between 1922 and 1939
 Albatross (2011 film), a British film
 Albatross (2015 film), an Icelandic film
 Albatross (Monty Python sketch), a sketch from Monty Python's Flying Circus, first appearing in 1970
 "Albatross" (Star Trek: The Animated Series), a 1974 episode of the animated television series
 "Albatross" (Law & Order: Criminal Intent), a 2007 episode of the television crime drama

Music 
 An Albatross, an American artcore/grindcore band
 Albatross (Nepali band)

Albums
 Albatross (Big Wreck album) (2012)
 Albatross (The Classic Crime album) (2006)
 Albatross, a 2005 album by The Standard
 The Albatross (album)
 Albatross (Fleetwood Mac album), a 1977 compilation album by Fleetwood Mac and Christine Perfect

Songs
 "Albatross" (Big Wreck song)
 "Albatross" (Corrosion of Conformity song) (1994)
 "Albatross" (instrumental), a 1968 instrumental by Fleetwood Mac
 "Albatross", an unreleased song by Brave Saint Saturn
 "Albatross", a 1967 song by Judy Collins from Wildflowers
 "Albatross", a 1979 song by Public Image Ltd. from Metal Box
 "Albatross", a 1997 song by the American band Bright from The Albatross Guest House
 "Albatross", a 2011 song by Wild Beasts
 "Albatross", a 2015 song by Foals from What Went Down
 "Albatross", a 2022 song by Kevin Devine from Nothing's Real, So Nothing's Wrong

Transportation

Aircraft 
 Albatros Airlines (Turkey), a Turkish charter airline from 1992 to 1996
 Albatros Airways, an Albanian budget airline
 Albatros Flugzeugwerke, a German aircraft manufacturer 
 Albatross Soaring Machine, an unsuccessful flying machine designed by William Paul Butusov in 1896
 Aero L-39 Albatros, a Czech jet trainer aircraft
 de Havilland Albatross, a four-engine British transport aircraft
 Grumman HU-16 Albatross, a US Air Force, Navy and Coast Guard amphibious flying boat
 Beriev A-40 Albatros, a Russian amphibious plane
 Gossamer Albatross, a human-powered airplane
 L'Albatros artificiel, gliders built by Jean-Marie Le Bris in 1856–1868

Automobiles 
 Albatros (automobile), a British automobile
 Albatros (1912 automobile), a French automobile
 Albatross (automobile), an American sports car venture that was planned in 1939

Trains 
 V250 (train) or Albatross, a high-speed train designed to operate between Amsterdam and Brussels
 Albatross, a GWR 3031 Class locomotive built for and run on the Great Western Railway between 1891 and 1915

Ships 
 List of ships named Albatros or Albatross

Other uses 
 Albatross (cloth), a lightweight, soft material with a napped and slightly creped surface
 Albatross (golf), a score of three under par on a hole
 Albatross (metaphor), an encumbrance or a wearisome burden
 Albatross (Rolling Thunder), a video game character
 Albatross, Missouri
 Grupo Albatros, a special operations service of the Argentine Naval Prefecture
 HMAS Albatross (air station), a Royal Australian Navy base
 Albatross Foundation USA, an environmental group
 Albatross Marine, a British manufacturer of very light aluminium speedboats
 Michael Gross (swimmer) or "The Albatross", former professional swimmer

See also